The 2019 France Women's T20I Quadrangular Series was a women's Twenty20 International (WT20I) cricket tournament held in Nantes, France, from 31 July to 3 August. The participants were the women's national sides of France, Austria, Jersey and Norway. Matches in the series were recognised as official WT20I games as per ICC's announcement that full WT20I status would apply to all the matches played between women's teams of associate members after 1 July 2018. Jersey Women were the only side of the four to have previously played a WT20I (against Guernsey Women on 31 May 2019). The matches were played at the Cricket Ground, Parc du Grand Blottereau in Nantes. France won the tournament after winning 5 of their 6 matches.

Squads

Points table

Matches

References

External links
 Series home at ESPN Cricinfo

Cricket in France
2019 in women's cricket
Associate international cricket competitions in 2019